Small Cajal body specific RNA 25 (otherwise known as scaRNA25, HBI-100, MBI-100, and MBI-114) is a scaRNA, which are a class of ncRNAs characterised as small nuclear RNAs localised to the Cajal bodies.

ScaRNA25 was originally identified in a large scale cloning project in mice.
Later sequence analysis predicted that this RNA guides the pseudouridylation of position U40 in the U6 snRNA.

References

External links
 
 

Small nuclear RNA